Hamāvāyān Ensemble is a Persian music group.

History 
Led by Iranian instrumentalist and composer Hossein Alizadeh, the Hamavayan Ensemble performs new interpretations of classical Persian music.
The ensemble features male and female vocalists, tar and setar (ancient plucked lutes from Persia), and percussion.

Maestro Alizadeh's most recent recording, Endless Vision, featuring the Hamavayan Ensemble with the Armenian duduk player Djivan Gasparyan, was nominated for a Grammy.

Members 
Hossein Alizadeh, tar, shourangiz (new lute)
Mohammad Motamedi, vocal
Afsaneh Rasaei, vocal
Majid Khaladj, tombak
Ali Boustan, setar
Pouria Akhavass, vocal
Nima Alizadeh, robab (lute)
Saba Alizadeh, kamancheh
mohammad enshaie, kamancheh, gheychak

See also
Music of Iran
Masters of Persian Music
Mastan Ensemble
List of Iranian musicians

Notes

Persian classical music groups